The Canal de Marseille au Rhône connects the Mediterranean Sea at Marseille to the Rhône at Arles.  The section between Marignane and Marseille has been closed since the collapse of the Rove Tunnel in 1963.

Description
The canal consists of the Rove Tunnel from the harbor on the Mediterranean, the section leading to the Étang de Berre, the Bouc à Martigues canal (or Caronte canal), the Rhône à Fos canal and the Saint-Louis canal.
There are two channels at Martigues, the Gallifet canal and the Baussengue canal, used only for recreational boats.
Martigues island, between the two canals, is divided by the small canal of Saint-Sébastien, which runs along its length.
The complex of waterways at Martigues has led to its being called the "Venice of Provence".

History

The possibility of building a canal with a tunnel through the chaîne de l'Estaque to the northwest of Marseille had been discussed for many years.
A proposal was developed for the Marseille Chamber of Commerce in 1879 by the engineer Guérard, but no action was taken until an act of 24 December 1903 authorized the project. 
Preparatory work began in 1906.
On 7 May 1916 Marcel Sembat, Minister of Public Works, and Joseph Thierry, Under-secretary of State for War, inaugurated the Rove Tunnel and the first two cranes of Port-de-Bouc.
After many delays, the full canal was finally opened to traffic in April 1927.
It was closed in 1963 after a section of the tunnel collapsed.

See also
 List of canals in France

References

Sources

Marseille
Canals opened in 1927